The Miss Washington Teen USA competition is the pageant that selects the representative for the state of Washington in the Miss Teen USA pageant.

Washington is one of the more successful states at Miss Teen USA, having placed on eight occasions. Their highest placement came in 1985, when Dru Homer placed 2nd runner-up to Kelly Hu of Hawaii. Their most successful decades have been the 1980s and 2000s. The state failed to place in the 1990s.

Alex Carlson-Helo is the first Miss Washington Teen USA who also won Miss Washington USA. Washington was the last state to have a Teen to Miss crossover. Two more former Teen winners later won the Miss state title, including one in Nevada.

Kate Dixon was crowned Miss Washington Teen USA 2022 on February 5, 2022 at Renton IKEA Performing Arts Center in Renton, Washington. She will represent Washington for the title of Miss Teen USA 2022. However much controversy has arisen after a video resurfaced of her using a racial slur and making inappropriate statements on social media. Dixon said, "They coerced me into saying a racial slur. I told them ‘no, I don’t want to say that,’" said Kate. "I know that it’s not appropriate. And they told me ‘you have a free pass just this one time, it would be funny."

Results summary

Placements
2nd runner-up: Dru Homer (1985)
Top 10: Rhonda Monroe (1983), Amy Travis (1989), Megan Munroe (2000), Shannon Hulbert (2001), Jasmine Jorgensen (2003)
Top 15: Sadie Porter (2009), Camilla Cyr (2010)
Washington holds a record of 8 placements at Miss Teen USA.

Awards
Miss Congeniality: Marianne Bautista (2020)
Miss Photogenic: Anjelie Eldredge (1994)
Best State Costume: Novalee Lewis (2021; 3rd place)

Winners 

1 Age at the time of the Miss Teen USA pageant

References

External links
Official website

Washington
Women in Washington (state)